Scotts Hill is a town in Decatur and Henderson counties in the U.S. state of Tennessee. The population was 984 at the 2010 census.

The community was named after Micajah Scott, a pioneer settler and the first merchant to settle in the town. The name "Scotts Hill" is derived from the location of Scott's store, which sat on the hill across from the current Methodist Church.

History 
Scotts Hill was first settled in 1825 by Charles Austin. The town was incorporated in April 1917, and Isiaac Wesley Patterson served as the first mayor. The town developed quickly, due its location on a main stagecoach route from Clifton, Tennessee to Jackson, Tennessee.

Shortly after its incorporation, in May 1917, the east end of Scotts Hill was destroyed by a severe tornado. The town was again damaged on October 16, 1917, when a fire destroyed all twelve businesses and five homes.

The Scotts Hill College opened in 1896, and ceased operation around 1917. The public water system was established in 1957.

Geography
Scotts Hill is located in southeastern Henderson County and southwestern Decatur County at  (35.515322, -88.250958). Tennessee State Route 100 passes through the town, north of the center, leading northeast  to Decaturville and southwest  to Henderson.

Demographics

As of the census of 2000, there were 894 people, 376 households, and 268 families residing in the town. The population density was 357.9 people per square mile (138.1/km2). There were 439 housing units at an average density of 175.7 per square mile (67.8/km2). The racial makeup of the town was 99.22% White, 0.11% Native American, 0.34% from other races, and 0.34% from two or more races. Hispanic or Latino of any race were 1.01% of the population.

There were 376 households, out of which 31.6% had children under the age of 18 living with them, 56.1% were married couples living together, 11.2% had a female householder with no husband present, and 28.7% were non-families. 27.1% of all households were made up of individuals, and 16.8% had someone living alone who was 65 years of age or older. The average household size was 2.36 and the average family size was 2.81.

In the town, the population was spread out, with 24.6% under the age of 18, 6.9% from 18 to 24, 26.0% from 25 to 44, 25.2% from 45 to 64, and 17.3% who were 65 years of age or older. The median age was 39 years. For every 100 females, there were 86.3 males. For every 100 females age 18 and over, there were 88.8 males.

The median income for a household in the town was $28,750, and the median income for a family was $36,125. Males had a median income of $25,625 versus $21,111 for females. The per capita income for the town was $19,141. About 13.1% of families and 18.2% of the population were below the poverty line, including 26.6% of those under age 18 and 21.7% of those age 65 or over.

Education 
Scotts Hill Elementary School currently operates pre-kindergarten through eighth grade. The nearby high school, Scotts Hill High School, is located in Reagan, Tennessee.

Notable people
Whitney Duncan, country music artist

References

External links

 City of Scotts Hill official website

Towns in Decatur County, Tennessee
Towns in Henderson County, Tennessee
Towns in Tennessee